Richard Lang may refer to:

Richard Lang (CEO), co-founder and CEO of Democrasoft
Richard Lang (cyclist) (born 1989), Australian racing cyclist
Rick Lang (born 1953), Canadian curler
Richard Lang (director), American television and film director (A Change of Seasons etc.)
Richard Lang (programmer), British computer programmer, co-author of ChessGenius

See also
Richard Langly